The 2019–20 Charleston Southern Buccaneers men's basketball team represented Charleston Southern University in the 2019–20 NCAA Division I men's basketball season. The Buccaneers, led by 15th-year head coach Barclay Radebaugh, played their home games at the CSU Field House in North Charleston, South Carolina as members of the Big South Conference. They finished the season 14–18, 7–11 in Big South play to finish in a three-way tie for seventh place. They defeated Presbyterian in the first round of the Big South tournament before losing in the quarterfinals to Radford.

Previous season
The Buccaneers finished the 2018–19 season 18–16 overall, 9–7 in Big South play to finish in a tie for fifth place. In the Big South tournament, they defeated USC Upstate in the first round, upset Winthrop in the quarterfinals, before losing to Radford in the semifinals. They received an invitation to the CIT, where they defeated Florida Atlantic in the first round, before falling to Hampton in the second round.

Roster

Schedule and results

|-
!colspan=12 style=| Non-conference regular season

|-
!colspan=9 style=| Big South Conference regular season

|-
!colspan=12 style=| Big South tournament
|-

|-

Source

References

Charleston Southern Buccaneers men's basketball seasons
Charleston Southern Buccaneers
Charleston Southern Buccaneers men's basketball
Charleston Southern Buccaneers men's basketball